Pak Jong-chon is a North Korean Marshal and a member of the Presidium of the Politburo of the Workers' Party of Korea.

Biography
In 2014, he was appointed Deputy Chief of the General Staff and Chief of Fire Command at the General Staff. However, he was demoted to Major General in 2015 and the Deputy Chief of Staff was fired. In 2016 he was promoted to Lieutenant General and was elected a member of the Central Committee of the Workers' Party of Korea and Director General of the General Staff Department. He was promoted to Colonel General in 2017. He was promoted to General of the Army on April 14, 2019, and was appointed Chief of Staff of the General Staff of the Korean People's Army, having replaced Ri Yong-gil. The appointment is attributed to the successful launch of the new short-range ballistic missile as Artillery Director.

Pak also accompanied Kim Jong-un to the ceremony to the upgrading of the status of Samjiyon from a county (kun) status to a city which was described by the news as a socialist "paradise". He also has accompanied Kim Jong-un to Mt. Paektu and was seen riding near him on a horse.

On May 23, 2020, Pak was promoted to vice marshal. He is often considered a "rising star" in the North Korean power hierarchy.

On 5 October 2020, Pak was promoted to Marshal of the Korean People's Army.

He was reportedly stripped of his Marshal title and demoted to alternate Politburo member in June 2021, following an unspecified "grave incident". In September, however, he was promoted to member of the Politburo Presidium and transferred from his military role to a position as secretary of the Central Committee. On 25 April 2022 he was disclosed as a vice chairman of the Central Military Commission of the Workers' Party of Korea. On 1 January 2023, he was removed as the vice chairman of the CMC.

References

|-

|-

|-

Members of the Supreme People's Assembly
Korean communists
North Korean military personnel
Living people
Year of birth missing (living people)
Members of the 8th Politburo of the Workers' Party of Korea
Members of the 8th Central Committee of the Workers' Party of Korea